David Ostrander is a former American football coach and college administrator. He served as the head football coach at Iowa Wesleyan College in Mount Pleasant, Iowa (1977), Loras College in Dubuque, Iowa (1978–1979), and Monmouth College in Monmouth, Illinois (1980–1983), compiling a career college football coaching record of 13–50–1. He most recently served as the vice president for advancement at Linfield College in McMinnville, Oregon.

A native of Buffalo Center, Iowa, Ostrander played college football at Coe College in Cedar Rapids, Iowa. He was an assistant football coach at Iowa Wesleyan for two years before being named head coach in January 1977.

Head coaching record

College football

References

Year of birth missing (living people)
Living people
Coe Kohawks football players
Iowa Wesleyan Tigers football coaches
Loras Duhawks football coaches
Monmouth Fighting Scots football coaches
People from Winnebago County, Iowa
Players of American football from Iowa